Joseph in the Land of Egypt (Yiddish title: Yoysef in Mitsraim) is a 1932 American historical drama film directed by George Roland and starring Joseph Green. The film is based on the biblical drama "Joseph and His Brethren". The film is considered to be the first talkie filmed in Yiddish.

Production notes
Joseph in the Land of Egypt was intended to exploit the burgeoning Yiddish-speaking theater-going in America by introducing them to the new medium of film. Rather than creating an original film, Green took an Italian silent film of Jewish interest and dubbed it in Yiddish. Joseph Green, the producer, also took the starring role of Joseph for himself.

Reception
The film was well received by audiences in both the United States and Europe. That summer, Green took his film to Poland, then the largest Jewish center in Europe. Although most theater owners were reluctant to show it there, fearing that it would spark anti-Semitism, he eventually found two theater owners who were willing to show the film during the week of Passover. According to one story, the theater owners barred the door of their office with their bodies and declared that Green could not leave until he agreed to allow them to show the film.

Joseph in the Land of Egypt was an immediate success and had a 30-week run at that theater before making its way through the rest of the country. With the film's success, Green went on to produce several more films in Poland, all of which were considered highlights of the Yiddish cinema.

Resources

External links 
 
 

1932 films
1930s independent films
1930s historical drama films
American historical drama films
American independent films
American black-and-white films
Films based on the Book of Genesis
Films set in ancient Egypt
Yiddish-language films
Yiddish-language mass media in the United States
Cultural depictions of Joseph (Genesis)
1932 drama films
1930s American films